Copenhaver may refer to:

Copenhaver, West Virginia, an unincorporated community in Kanawha County

People with the surname Copenhaver
Brian Copenhaver (born 1942), American academic
Deborah Copenhaver Fellows (born 1948), American sculptor
John Thomas Copenhaver Jr. (born 1925), American judge